Florian Donderer (born 1969 in Berlin) is a German violinist and conductor.

Career 
Donderer's parents were also musicians: his father a cellist, his mother a flautist.

Donderer studied violin in London and Berlin, where he was a scholarship holder at the Karajan Academy of the Berlin Philharmonic.

In 2010, he made his first appearance as conductor with the Ensemble Oriol and Christiane Oelze at a concert in the Berlin Philharmonie. He has been artistic director of the music festival Sommersprossen in Rottweil since 2019. He has played at the Spannungen chamber music festival in Heimbach. Donderer plays a violin by Stefan-Peter Greiner from 2003.

Private life 
Donderer is married to the cellist Tanja Tetzlaff they have two children.

References

External links 
 
 
 

German classical violinists
German composers
1969 births
Living people
Musicians from Berlin